A+ Pollux is a 2002 film by Luc Pagès adapted from a novel by Philippe Jaenada, Le Chameau sauvage.

Synopsis
It is a story of love over the most banal situations between Halvard (Gad Elmaleh) and Pollux (Cécile de France). Halvard is completely in love with the beautiful Pollux. She is the woman of his life. Even when she disappears, Halvard doesn't get the idea of standing shoulder to shoulder out of his head. But the disappearance creates problems of its own.

OFFICIAL SYNOPSIS :
True love, when it comes to 30-something translator Halvard Sanz, arrives suddenly and with a wild intensity. The incomparable Pollux walks into Halvard's dreary life just as she is putting a brutal end to one amorous relationship. From that first meeting, Halvard knows that Pollux is his soul mate – but she disappears from his life just as suddenly as she entered it. Ditching his current girlfriend, Halvard drives himself into a mad frenzy as he tries to track Pollux down, so that he can share the rest of his life with her. Alas, could this be a wild goose chase ... ?

Cast
 Gad Elmaleh : Halvard Sanz
 Cécile de France : Pollux
 Nathalie Boutefeu : Pascaline
 Jean-Marie Galey : Marc
 Marina Golovine : Cécile
 Marilú Marini : Marthe
 Pierre Berriau : Julien
 Thierry Godard : Intruder

Releases
 DVD A+ Pollux by Luc Pagès (ASIN B00008IZAN).

Technical details
 Design : Nicolas Derieux, Karima Rekhamdji
 Costumes : Bethsabée Dreyfus
 Format : colour – 2.35:1 – 35 mm

References

External links
 

French romantic comedy-drama films
2002 films
Films based on French novels
2000s French films